Edward Osuegbu  in Nigeria.

Osuegbu is the current Bishop of Okigwe He was born in 1959 in Imo State. Osuegbu was educated at Trinity Theological College, Umuahia
and ordained in 1984. He served as a college chaplain and an archdeacon before his episcopal appointment.

Notes

Living people
Anglican bishops of Okigwe
21st-century Anglican bishops in Nigeria
1959 births
People from Imo State
Trinity Theological College, Umuahia alumni
Anglican archdeacons in Africa
Church of Nigeria archdeacons